Google Pack was a collection of software tools offered by Google to download in a single archive. It was announced at the 2006 Consumer Electronics Show, on January 6. Google Pack was only available for Windows XP, Windows Vista, and Windows 7.

In September 2011, Google announced it would discontinue a number of its products, including Google Pack. Google Pack is no longer available for download.

Available applications before discontinued service
Users could choose which of the following software applications to install. If the application was already installed, Google Updater checked to see if the user had the latest version and upgraded it, if necessary.

The software applications that were available to download depended on the language, locale, and operating system.

Google-branded
 Google Desktop
 Picasa, a photograph organizer and editor
 Google Toolbar for Internet Explorer
 Google Photos Screensaver, which displays pictures from the user's computers
 Google Earth, an electronic globe
 Google Talk, an instant messaging and Voice over IP (VoIP) application
 Google Video Player, a multi-media player, now withdrawn
 Google Chrome, a free web browser developed by Google

Mac Software 
 Google Quick Search Box
 Google Earth
 Picasa for Mac
 SketchUp
 Notifier for Mac
 Picasa Web Albums Uploader
 Toolbar for Firefox

Third-party
 Mozilla Firefox with Google Toolbar
 Spyware Doctor with Anti-Virus
 Adobe Reader, a document viewer
 RealPlayer, a multi-media player
 Skype, a VoIP application
 StarOffice, a productivity suite that includes a word processor, a spreadsheet and a presentation program.
 Immunet Protect Antivirus
 avast! Free Antivirus
 WebM for IE9

In March 2007, Google added two new applications to the Google Pack: Spyware Doctor Starter Edition and Norton Security Scan. These programs were free and did not require a subscription, unlike Norton AntiVirus. However, Norton Security Scan does not offer continuous protection against viruses. Norton Security Scan scans the computer and identifies if there are existing viruses, worms, spyware, unwanted adware or Trojans residing on it.
The program's functionality is similar to Microsoft's Windows Malicious Software Removal Tool.

Google has stated they have no monetary agreement with the makers of the above software and they offered the applications for the ease of Google's customers. They didn't receive any payment for providing the software pack, although Miguel Helft in his New York Times blog reported that an unidentified source stated that Google may pay Sun for each copy of StarOffice. StarOffice was no longer part of Google Pack since November 2008.

Google has included the VoIP application Skype in the pack, even though it is a competitor of Google's own Google Talk.

Some industry observers claimed that the release was little more than a collection of software "that Google's wrapped a rubber band around".

Former third-party before discontinued service 
 Ad-Aware
 GalleryPlayer
 Norton Antivirus Special Edition 2005, which included a 6-month subscription
 Norton Security Scan
 Trillian
 Spyware Doctor Starter Edition

Google Updater 
Google Pack came with Google Updater as a package management system to assist in downloading, installing, removing, and automatically updating the Pack's applications. Updater could be uninstalled without removing the applications.

References 

Pack
Beta software